Baelo Claudia was an ancient Roman town of Hispania, located  outside of Tarifa, near the village of Bolonia, in southern Spain. Lying on the shores of the Strait of Gibraltar, the town was originally a fishing village and trade link when it was settled some 2,000 years ago. Although prosperous at the time of Emperor Claudius, it went into a decline hastened by earthquakes and was abandoned by the 6th century.

The study of its architectural remains shows its Roman origin at the end of the 2nd century BC, already observed since that time a great wealth that makes it an important economic center in the Mediterranean area.

History

Baelo Claudia is situated on the northern shore of the Strait of Gibraltar. The town was founded in the end of the 2nd century BC as a result of trade with North Africa (it was a major port for Tangier, in Mauretania Tingitana, for example). It is possible that Baelo Claudia had some functions of governmental administration, but tuna fishing, salting, and the production of garum were the primary sources of wealth. The city was eventually successful enough to be granted the title of municipium by Emperor Claudius.

The life of the inhabitants reached its greatest splendor during the 1st century BC and the 2nd century AD. In the middle of the 2nd century, however, the town declined, probably as a result of a major earthquake which wiped out a large part. In addition to such natural disasters, by the 3rd century, the town was beset by hordes of pirates, both Germanic and Barbary. Although it experienced a slight renaissance later in the century, by the 6th century, the town had been abandoned.

Excavations have revealed the most comprehensive remains of a Roman town in the whole of the Iberian Peninsula, with extremely interesting monuments such as the basilica, theatre, market, and the temple of Isis. The spectacular setting in El Estrecho Natural Park allows the visitor to see the coast of Morocco. A modern visitors' centre showcases many artefacts and has a comprehensive introduction to the site. It also offers parking, shade, toilets, a shop and good views of the sea. Admission is free to citizens of the European Economic Area (with an ID).

The archeological site
The figure of Jorge Bonsor is key in the recovery of the archaeological site.

Its urban layout are distinguished the two main classical routes of the Roman city: the decumanus maximus, which ran from east to west and at the ends were located the entrance to the city, and the cardo maximus, which crosses it at a right angle and therefore in a north-south direction.

At the intersection of these two main streets was the Forum (main square), whose current pavement is the original slabs of Tarifa, preserved since the 1st century, and around which the main public buildings were distributed. This was an open square with porticos on three sides, from one of which three of them were accessed: the emperor's temple, the curia, and another that served as a meeting room. The main building, located in the background is the basilica, for various purposes and especially the seat of the courts of justice; and on the left side there were small rectangular constructions made of stones: the shops, or tabernae.

In the archaeological site, representative and essential elements of a Roman town have been preserved, namely:
 Stone walls, reinforced with more than forty watchtowers, of which the main gates of the city are conserved, the one that was directed to Gades, to the west, and the one that was directed at Carteia (near San Roque). Towards the east, there existed a third door north of the city, called Puerta de Asido.
 Administrative buildings: curia (local senate) and the municipal archive.
 A public square (forum).
 A courthouse (judicial basilica), located in the forum in front of the temples. It has rectangular plant and measures 19.5 by 35.5 meters. It was presided by a statue of the emperor Trajan more than 3 meters high.
 Four temples, three of which are dedicated to the Capitoline Triad (Jupiter, Juno and Minerva). Such a triple layout has only been found in Sbeitla, Tunisia.  There is also an Iseum (temple of the Egyptian goddess Isis), related to the Isiac cult on the peninsula. 
 The largest building in Baelo Claudia is the theater, with a capacity of up to 2000 people, where all the actors were men, even in the roles of women, which to interpret were they put on masks, depending on the character they represented.
 Remains of the tabernae (shops), the macellum (market), enclosed area for the sale of meat and other food, formed by 14 stores and an inner courtyard; and the thermae (bath houses).

Four aqueducts supplied water to the city. Evidence of the industrial area include the garum-manufacturing facilities, streets, aqueducts, remnants of the sewerage system, etc. In no other Roman sites on the Iberian Peninsula is it possible to find such a variety of vestiges of Roman urbanism as in Baelo Claudia. The significance of the site is enhanced by the spectacular landscape that surrounds the city.

Its status as a Bien de Interés Cultural (Property of Cultural Interest) was officially announced in 1925 in the Gaceta de Madrid, the state gazette.
The archaeological site has been accompanied by a museum since 2007, incorporated into the Institutional Headquarters and Visitors Center of the Archaeological Site of Baelo Claudia, designed by the architect Guillermo Vázquez Consuegra.

Gallery

The current site 
The archaeological site is next to a tourist area, so it is beginning to exploit its potential cultural tourism. The site is easily accessed and visits are free, except for foreigners who must pay a fee to visit it.

The Junta de Andalucía has built a new visitor reception center (of which the architect is Guillermo Vázquez Consuegra) and has carried out a Landscape Action Project in the Ensenada de Bolonia (written and executed by the Andalusian Institute of Historical Heritage between 2010 and 2013). Likewise, the University of Cádiz conducts studies of the site, giving rise to new discoveries, as the only copy of the Doryphoros of Polykleitos in Hispania.

See also
List of Bien de Interés Cultural in the Province of Cádiz

Sources

References

External links

Official website
Map, Directions and Practical Information

Buildings and structures in Tarifa
Roman sites in Spain
Archaeological sites in Andalusia
Former populated places in Spain
Buildings and structures in the Province of Cádiz
Museums in Andalusia
Archaeological museums in Spain
Museums of ancient Rome in Spain
Bien de Interés Cultural landmarks in the Province of Cádiz
1st-century churches
Roman aqueducts outside Rome
Buildings and structures completed in the 2nd century BC